The 367th Infantry Division was a German infantry division in World War II.

History 

It was formed on 11 November 1943 in Zagreb, Independent State of Croatia from personnel of the 330. Infantry-Division and new recruits born in 1926, as part of the 21. Welle (21st wave of mobilization). 
The division took part in anti-partisan operations in Croatia.

Already in February 1944, it was transferred to the Eastern Front in Ukraine in the Brody sector with the 1st Panzer Army.
Later, she became part of the 4th Army in Army Group Centre and fought in Poland around Białystok and Augustów.
The division ended up in East Prussia, where she was wiped out during the Battle of Königsberg in March 1945.

Commanding officers

Generalleutnant Georg Zwade, (15 November 1943 – 10 May 1944)
Generalmajor Adolf Fischer, (10 May 1944 - 1 August 1944)	
Generalleutnant Hermann Hähnle. (1 August 1944 - March 1945).

References
 Lexikon der Wehrmacht

Infantry divisions of Germany during World War II